On the Stroke of Three is a 1924 American silent drama film directed by F. Harmon Weight and starring Kenneth Harlan, Madge Bellamy, and Mary Carr.

Plot
As described in a review in a film magazine, Lafayette Jordan (Davis), financier, plans to inundate Caribou Canyon and turn it into a reservoir, but the villagers will not sell him their land. Among the resentful villagers is Judson Forrest (Harlan), who wants to be an inventor. Mary Jordan (Bellamy), daughter of the financier, is hurt and spends a night at his home. Learning of his attitude toward her father, she poses as a domestic at the Jordan home. Later, in New York, Judson looks her up. He is trying to sell his invention and, to get funds, he mortgages his home. The village banker, in league with Jordan, sells the financier the mortgage, and a foreclosure threatens when Jordan's business agent Henry Mogridge (Miljan) double-crosses Judson. The youth thinks Mary working against him. Friends come to Judson's aid and he pays off the mortgage in the nick of time. He learns that Jordan knew nothing of the methods employed by his agent and that Mary loves him.

Cast

Preservation
With no prints of On the Stroke of Three located in any film archives, it is a lost film.

References

Bibliography
 Munden, Kenneth White. The American Film Institute Catalog of Motion Pictures Produced in the United States, Part 1. University of California Press, 1997.

External links

1924 films
1924 drama films
1920s English-language films
American silent feature films
Silent American drama films
American black-and-white films
Films directed by F. Harmon Weight
Film Booking Offices of America films
1920s American films